British Future is a UK-based think tank and registered charity whose stated aim is to advance the education of the public in the subjects of equality and diversity, human rights, racial and cultural harmony, citizenship and social inclusion.

History 
Incorporated in June 2011, it was initially called The Communications Organisation and was renamed British Future in December 2011. It became a charity in 2014, having been previously run as a not-for-profit organisation.

Its director is Sunder Katwala, a former director of the Fabian Society. British Future states that it is a non-partisan organisation. It works with other think tanks, including Demos.

Research and campaigns 
In 2017, research by British Future suggested that the Conservative Party would have claimed a 42-seat majority in the 2017 general election if it had the same level of support among ethnic minority Britons as it does among white voters.

It ran a campaign for shops to close and sporting events not to be played on Remembrance Sunday 2014, ninety-six years after the end of the First World War.

Publications 
Its publications include This Sceptred Isle, Team GB: How 2012 Should Boost Britain, and Generation 2012: Optimism Despite Obstacles.

References

Think tanks based in the United Kingdom
Political organisations based in London